Uusitalo is a Finnish surname. Notable people with the surname include:

 Eino Uusitalo (1924–2015), Finnish politician
 Arja Uusitalo (born 1951), Finnish poet and journalist
 Sami Uusitalo (born 1977), Finnish bass guitarist
 Ville Uusitalo (born 1979), Finnish professional ice hockey defenceman
 Markus Uusitalo (born 1997), Finnish professional footballer

Finnish-language surnames